The Union Townshop Covered Bridge was southeast of Hollandsburg, Indiana. The single-span Burr Arch covered bridge structure was built by J. J. Daniels in 1851 and torn down in 1872 during the rebuilding of the Plank Road into a toll-free road.

History

Construction
This bridge was built when the Plank Road between Indianapolis and Montezuma was put in. The planks soon rotted however and the Parke County Commissioners purchased the road, graveled it, and made it a free road.

Destruction
As part of the renovation of the Plank Road the Parke County Commissioners had the bridge torn down and a new bridge, the Hollandsburg Covered Bridge, built to replace it.

See also
 Parke County Covered Bridges
 Parke County Covered Bridge Festival

References

Former covered bridges in Parke County, Indiana
Bridges completed in 1851
Bridges Built by J. J. Daniels
1851 establishments in Indiana
Wooden bridges in Indiana
Burr Truss bridges in the United States
Road bridges in Indiana
Buildings and structures demolished in 1872